The Snowden House is a historic building located in Waterloo, Iowa, United States.  William Snowden was a local pharmacist.  He had this house built in 1878.  It became the home of the Waterloo Women's Club in 1922.  The house is a two-story, brick, rectangular Italianate structure.  It features a hip roof, a shallow gable with a blind oculus on the main facade, bracketed eaves, and a full-length front porch.  The house has segmentally arched windows throughout, with the windows on the front capped with hoodmolds.  The two-story wing on the back is a later addition.  The interior was completely rebuilt after a 1955 fire.  The house was listed on the National Register of Historic Places in 1977.

References

Houses completed in 1878
Italianate architecture in Iowa
Houses in Waterloo, Iowa
National Register of Historic Places in Black Hawk County, Iowa
Houses on the National Register of Historic Places in Iowa